KBSO (94.7 FM, "US 94.7") is a radio station broadcasting a Texas country music format and licensed to Corpus Christi, Texas, United States. The station is currently owned by Reina Broadcasting Inc.

History
The Federal Communications Commission issued a construction permit for the station on February 12, 1991. The station was assigned the KBSO call sign on March 1, 1991, and received its license to cover on January 25, 1993.

On June 1, 2013 KBSO, rebranded as "My 94.7".

On January 16. 2015, KBSO rebranded as "94.7 The Rig".

On May 3, 2015, KBSO adopted KYRK's old format as "94.7 The Shark".

On July 2, 2015, KBSO changed their format to a simulcast of Texas Country-formatted KCCT 1150 AM.
In 2017, the KCCT simulcast broke, with KCCT flipping to 80's music and KBSO remaining with Texas music.

References

External links

BSO
Radio stations established in 1993
1993 establishments in Texas